Murcia, officially the Municipality of Murcia,  is a 1st class municipality in the province of Negros Occidental, Philippines. According to the 2020 census, it has a population of 88,868 people.

Geography

Barangays

Murcia is politically subdivided into 23 barangays

 Abo-abo
 Alegria
 Amayco
 Zone I (Poblacion)
 Zone II (Poblacion)
 Zone III (Poblacion)
 Zone IV (Poblacion)
 Zone V (Poblacion)
 Blumentritt
 Buenavista
 Caliban
 Canlandog
 Cansilayan
 Damsite
 Iglau-an
 Lopez Jaena
 Minoyan
 Pandanon (Silos)
 San Miguel
 Santa Cruz
 Santa Rosa
 Salvacion
 Talotog

Climate

Demographics

Economy

Tourism

The Mambukal Resort in Barangay Minoyan, Murcia, Negros Occidental has bats as tourist attraction. There resort has 3 species of bats – the Philippine Flying Fox (Philippine Giant Fruit Bat), the Philippine bare-backed fruit bat, and the Little Golden-mantled Flying Fox, which is already endangered. They produce a nitrogen-rich organic fertilizer called guano. Bats are included in the list of animals protected by Republic Act 9147 (Wildlife Resources Conservation and Protection Act). The provincial government-owned Mambukal Resort inaugurated its "Butterfly Garden," on December, 2007. Live predators of butterflies like tarantula, wild geckos, scorpions, millipedes and centipedes were displayed.

Aside from the Mambukal Mountain Resort, Murcia is also famous for its Pandanon River Resort situated in the Murcia-Don Salvador Benedicto municipality border. A golf and country club is situated in Barangay Blumentritt.  The newly built Kahulihoha Herbal Garden and Serenity Park can be found in Barangay Alegria.

Notable personalities
 Donnie Nietes - Professional Boxing World Champion

Twin cities 
 Murcia, Spain
 Baguio, Philippines

References

External links

Murcia Profile at the Official Website of Negros Occidental
 [ Philippine Standard Geographic Code]
Philippine Census Information
Local Governance Performance Management System

Municipalities of Negros Occidental